Kasbah Mosque is a mosque in Tunis, Tunisia. It is a listed as a Historical Monument.

Localization 
This mosque is located in the Medina, in the Kasbah district which is still home to government buildings.

History 
The mosque was commissioned by Abu Zakariya Yahya (r. 1230–1249), in 1230 or 1231, shortly after he declared his independence from the Almohads in 1229. He became the founder of the Hafsid dynasty which ruled Ifriqiya (roughly present-day Tunisia) until the 16th century. The architect was Ali ibn Muhammad ibn Qasim. The minaret was completed in 1233. It was the first Friday mosque to be built in Tunis after Al-Zaytuna Mosque. The mosque was built in the Kasbah, the citadel or seat of government in the city which was first established by the Almohads. Shortly before the mosque's foundation Abu Zakariya had begun construction of new palace for himself in the Kasbah. Initially it was a place of prayer for the rulers who lived in the Kasbah only, but it later became a public mosque for the Friday prayer open to the whole city. The mosque was renovated under Ottoman rule in 1584, at which point its wooden minbar was replaced with a stone minbar.

Architecture 
The mosque has a rectangular prayer hall that is deeper than it is wide, which was unusual for Almohad-style mosques of the era. The prayer hall is divided into seven "naves" between rows of horseshoe arches, with nine arch spans for each nave. The arches are supported on marble columns with Hafdsid-period capitals. The hall is roofed by a series of groin vaults. The mihrab (niche symbolizing the direction of prayer) in the southeast wall is decorated with marble paneling and flanked by decorative colonettes, although most of it is no longer preserved in its original condition. Above and in front of the mihrab is a dome sculpted in intricate muqarnas (stalactite-like decoration). This decorative technique was common in more western regions of North Africa but the muqarnas dome of this mosque is almost unique in Ifriqiya (Tunisia) and was unparalleled in other Hafsid architecture.

The design of the minaret is directly inherited from Almohad architecture further west. In particular, it resembles the design of the minaret of the Kasbah Mosque in Marrakesh, Morocco, in both its overall form and in the decoration of its facades. The four facades are covered in two different sebka or lozange-like motifs. However, unlike the mosque in Marrakesh, which was made in brick, the main structure and the decoration of this minaret are made of stone, reflecting the ancient local traditions of stone cutting. The upper part of the minaret is decorated with triple horseshoe-arch-shaped windows surrounded by a zone covered with tiles. The minaret's style influenced the look of later minarets in Tunisia and was often copied. Examples of this influence are the minaret of the 17th-century Great Mosque of Testour and the modern minaret of the Al-Zaytuna Mosque.

References 

Mosques in Tunis
13th-century mosques
Hafsid architecture